Billingsville may refer to:

Billingsville, Indiana, an unincorporated community in Union County
Billingsville, Missouri, an unincorporated community 
Billingsville School, a historic building in North Carolina